Monroe Presbyterian Church is a historic Presbyterian church at 20 E. 100 North in Monroe, Utah.

It was started in 1844.  It was added to the National Register of Historic Places in 1980.

•[note: the aforementioned date of 1844 would be inaccurate as (according to Monroe's Wikipedia entry) settlers didn't come until after 1860. With few exceptions, permanent settlements in Utah began in 1847 when the Mormon Pioneers arrived - therefore this church would not be circa 1844].

References

Presbyterian churches in Utah
Churches on the National Register of Historic Places in Utah
Churches completed in 1844
Buildings and structures in Sevier County, Utah
National Register of Historic Places in Sevier County, Utah